Peter John Haworth Doyle (born 3 May 1944) is the retired Roman Catholic Bishop of Northampton.

Early life
Doyle was born on 3 May 1944 in Wilpshire, Lancashire, the son of John Robert Doyle and his wife Alice Gertrude (née Haworth) He was educated at St Ignatius' College, Stamford Hill, London, before ordination as a priest in 1968.

Career
He was a curate at Portsmouth and Windsor between 1968 and 1975, then administrator of the Cathedral of St John the Evangelist, Portsmouth, 1975 to 1987, parish priest of St Joseph's, Maidenhead, 1987 to 1991 and of St Peter's, Winchester, 1991 to 2005, and concurrently a canon of St John's Cathedral, Portsmouth, from 1983 to 2005.

Doyle's appointment to Northampton was Pope Benedict XVI's first senior appointment in the Roman Catholic Church in Britain.  He was consecrated at Northampton Cathedral on 28 June 2005 by Cormac Murphy-O'Connor.

Sportsman
Doyle played for rugby football clubs in Windsor and Portsmouth. He also plays golf and enjoys skiing.

Lourdes

Doyle actively encourages people to travel to Lourdes, to which he has a great attachment.

The Northampton diocese, together with the Dioceses of Clifton, East Anglia, Portsmouth and Southwark, plus Stonyhurst College travel each year with the Catholic Association Pilgrimage to Lourdes. Doyle became the Patron of the Catholic Association Hospitalité from 2012, on the retirement of Bishop Crispian Hollis.

References

External links

1944 births
Living people
People from Wilpshire
21st-century Roman Catholic bishops in England
Roman Catholic bishops of Northampton